Jung In-gi (born September 12, 1966) is a South Korean actor. Jung made his acting debut in 1990, and has remained active in mainstream and independent film as well as television, notably in Jury (2013), The Five (2013) and Gap-dong (2014).

Filmography

Film

Television series

Music video

Theater

Awards and nominations

References

External links 
 
 
 

1966 births
Living people
People from Gyeonggi Province
South Korean male film actors
South Korean male television actors
South Korean male stage actors
20th-century South Korean male actors
21st-century South Korean male actors